Yisuhe Town is an urban town and the seat of Xiangtan County in Hunan, China.  it had a population of 60,283 and an area of .

History
Yisuhe Town was built in 1950. In November 1992, Yisuhe Township merged with Shangma Township.

Administrative division
The town is divided into 17 villages and eight communities, the following areas: Baihua Community, Fuhaoge Community, Zhaojiazhou Community, Wujiaxiang Community, Fengxingshan Community, Niutouling Community, Chengtang Community, Yanjing Community, Yantang Village, Yunlong Village, Shantang Village, Qingguang Village, Chihu Village, Bajiao Village, Shangma Village, Shuizhu Village, Jinxia Village, Jingzhu Village, Qingshi Village, Fujiang Village, Yangxi Village, Zhangshu Village, Shanyin Village, Hezhou Village, and Yintang Village.

Geography
The town beside Xiang River, and Xiangtan City across Xiang River. Yisu Riveris known as "Juan River"(), a tributary of the Xiang River, it flows through the town, it originated from Zhurong Mountain in the Heng Mountains.

Transportation
The major highways are the 107 National Road and the 320 National Road.

Culture
Huaguxi is the most influence local theater.

Celebrity
, revolutionist.

References

External links

Divisions of Xiangtan County
County seats in Hunan